Mark Law is an American engineer. He is a distinguished professor in the  electrical and computer engineering department at the University of Florida.

Law attended Iowa State University where he earned his Bachelor of Science degree. He then attended Stanford University where he earned his Master of Science and Doctor of Philosophy degrees. Law was director the University of Florida honors program from 2014 to 2022.

References 

Living people
Place of birth missing (living people)
Year of birth missing (living people)
University of Florida faculty
Iowa State University alumni
Stanford University alumni
American engineers
20th-century American engineers
21st-century American engineers